Midway is an unincorporated community in Runeberg Township, Becker County, Minnesota, United States. In 2011, the Minnesota Department of Transportation estimated its population to be 10.

References

Unincorporated communities in Becker County, Minnesota
Unincorporated communities in Minnesota